The 1st Logistics Brigade "Prahova" (Brigada 1 Logistică "Prahova") is a logistics brigade currently belonging to the Romanian Land Forces and it is subordinated to the 1st Infantry Division. It was formed on 1 February 2001 and its headquarters are located in Ploieşti.

Structure
1st Logistics Brigade - Ploieşti
 1st  Transport Battalion 
 5th  Medical Battalion  
 102nd Maintenance Battalion

References

External links
   Official Site of the Romanian Land Forces
  Official Site of the 1st Territorial Army Corps

Brigades of Romania
Military units and formations established in 2001
Military logistics of Romania
2001 establishments in Romania